France–Lesotho relations are bilateral relations between the sovereign states of France and Lesotho. France has an embassy in Maseru, Lesotho, while Lesotho doesn’t have an embassy in Paris.

History
Historically, France and Lesotho have had good relations, due to the presence of French Protestant Missionaries in 1820. In 1868 these missionaries warned the king of Lesotho at the time,
Moshoeshoe I to make Lesotho a British protectorate because of the expansion of the Boers, thus, sparing the kingdom from Apartheid.

Modern Relations
While relations are modest, they are good shown by visits to France by Letsie III for the Africa-France Summit in 2007, and for COP-21 in 2015, and a visit to Lesotho by Jean-Marie Bockel in 2007.

References

Foreign relations of Lesotho
Foreign relations of France